Kim Suk-hee (born 1955), also known as Kim Sook-hee, is a South Korean Western painting artist and former art teacher at public schools previously served as Second Lady of South Korea from 2017 to 2020 during which her spouse, Lee Nak-yon, served as Prime Minister of South Korea.

Biography 
After finishing her undergraduate studies, Kim had dedicated her career in teaching arts in public schools in Seoul for over two decades til 2000. After retirement, she decided to hold her first solo exhibition as she was afraid she would never be able to pain again due to deteriorating eye sights and regret not having done it sooner.

After Kim's spouse was designated as the Prime Minister by President Moon Jae-in in early May 2017, there was false accusations that Jeonnam Development Corporation overpaid for her paintings to appease Lee. However, the paintings were not overpriced, given her experience and size of the paintings, and purchased 11 months before her spouse become the elected Governor of Jeonnam Province.

Kim holds two degrees from Ewha Womans University - a bachelor in painting and a master's in fine arts education.

References 

South Korean painters
1955 births
Ewha Womans University alumni
People from Jeonju
Living people